Fulvia Michela Caligiuri (born 1 July 1973) is an Italian politician from Forza Italia who was elected to the Italian Senate in 2018.

Political career 
She was a candidate in the 2019 European Parliament election in Southern Italy and received 20,369 first preference votes.

She joined the Italian Parliament on 31 July 2019 when she replaced Matteo Salvini.

References 

Living people
1973 births
21st-century Italian politicians
21st-century Italian women politicians
Senators of Legislature XVIII of Italy
Forza Italia (2013) senators
University of Calabria
Italian agriculturalists
20th-century Italian women
Women members of the Senate of the Republic (Italy)